This is a list of all easyJet Switzerland destinations :

List

See also 
 EasyJet destinations

References 

Lists of airline destinations